Betta mahachaiensis is a species of bubble-nesting betta native to Thailand, where it occurs naturally near the Gulf of Thailand. It is typically seen in stagnant waters in swamps, pools, and ponds. The species can be found in brackish waters, with salinity levels between 1.1 and 10.6 parts per thousand. Betta mahachaiensis is capable of living in both fresh water and brackish water, a trait unique among fish in the genus Betta. This species grows to a length of 5 to 6 cm (2 to 2.4 inches). It is found in the aquarium trade.

Betta mahachaiensis was discovered in 2012 by a team of biologists led by Dr. Bhinyo Panijpan's Mahidol University research group (with PhD candidate Mr. Chanon Kowasupat.). It was found in the province of Samut Sakhon in Thailand, and its specific name is a derivation of the Thai name for the sub-district. Male individuals of the species are distinguished from species such as Betta splendens by iridescent green-blue stripes on a brown-black background.

Betta mahachaiensis have a pair of suprabranchial chambers that each house an air‐breathing organ known as the labyrinth organ, a complex bony structure lined with thin, highly vascularised respiratory epithelium. The labyrinth organ is a morpho‐physiological adaptation that allows B. mahachaiensis to extract oxygen from air.

References 

mahachaiensis
Fishkeeping
Taxa named by Kowasupat
Taxa named by Bhinyo Panijpan
Taxa named by Pintip Ruenwongsa
Taxa named by Namkang Sriwattanarothai
Fish described in 2012
Fish of Thailand
Taxobox binomials not recognized by IUCN